= Canoeing at the 2010 South American Games – Men's C-1 1000 metres =

Event at the 2010 South American Games

The Men's C-1 1000m event at the 2010 South American Games was held over March 27 at 9:20.

== Medalists ==
Gold	Silver	Bronze
Wladimir Moreno; Brazil	Johnnathan Francisco Quitral; Chile	Edward Luciano Paredes; Venezuela

== Results ==
Rank	Athlete	Time
1st place, gold medalist(s)	Wladimir Moreno (BRA)	4:02.02
2nd place, silver medalist(s)	Johnnathan Francisco Quitral (CHI)	4:02.78
3rd place, bronze medalist(s)	Edward Luciano Paredes (VEN)	4:07.89
4	Sergio Díaz (COL)	4:08.69
5	Michael Antonio Mero (ECU)	4:33.19
6	Leonardo Niveiro (ARG)	4:41.92
